was a feudal domain under the Tokugawa shogunate of Edo period Japan, located in Hitachi Province (modern-day Ibaraki Prefecture), Japan. It was centered on Asō Jin'ya in what is now the city of Namegata, Ibaraki.  It was ruled for all of its history by the Shinjō clan.

History
Shinjō Naoyori, a retainer of Toyotomi Hideyoshi and lord of Takatsuki Domain in Settsu Province sided with the losing western forces in the Battle of Sekigahara in 1601, and was deprived of his lands. However, in 1604, after pledging his fealty to Tokugawa Ieyasu, he was restored to a 33,000 koku holding spanning eight districts of Hitachi and Shimotsuke Provinces, centered at Asō.

His son, Shinjō Naosada, divided the domain by giving 3000 koku to his younger brother Naofusa.  The 5th daimyō, Shinjō Naonori succeeded as an infant, and the domain continued to be run by his retired father, the 4th daimyō Shinjō Naotoki, who had established himself at a subsidiary 7000 koku holding in Kashima District. However, when Shinjō Naonori died at age 17 without an heir, the domain was suppressed by the Tokugawa shogunate. Shinjō Naotoki successfully petitioned the Shōgun for its restoration later the same year, but was given only 3000 koku of hatamoto lands to add to his existing 7000 koku.

During the Boshin War, the domain assisted in the suppression of the Mito Rebellion. The site of Asō Jin'ya is now occupied by Asō Elementary School, and the house of the karō of Asō Domain has been preserved as a museum.

The domain had a population of 6043 people in 1389 households per a census in 1838.

Holdings at the end of the Edo period
As with most domains in the han system, Asō Domain consisted of several discontinuous territories calculated to provide the assigned kokudaka, based on periodic cadastral surveys and projected agricultural yields.

Hitachi Province
4 villages in Ibaraki District
19 villages in Namegata District

List of daimyō

References

External links
   Aso  on "Edo 300 HTML"

Notes

Domains of Japan
1871 disestablishments in Japan
States and territories disestablished in 1871
Hitachi Province
History of Ibaraki Prefecture